Christine Fulcher (born 20 December 1954) is an Irish former swimmer. She competed in four events at the 1972 Summer Olympics.

References

1954 births
Living people
Irish female swimmers
Olympic swimmers of Ireland
Swimmers at the 1972 Summer Olympics
Place of birth missing (living people)